Street Mountain is a mountain located in Essex County, New York, named after Alfred Billings Street (1811–1881), a poet and New York State Librarian. 
The mountain is the high point of the Street Range of the Adirondack Mountains.
Street's northeast ridge is Nye Mountain.

Street Mountain stands within the watershed of the Saint Lawrence River, which drains into the Gulf of Saint Lawrence.
The southeast, east, and northeast slopes of Street Mtn. drain into the northern Indian Pass Brook, thence into the West Branch of the Ausable River, and Lake Champlain, thence into Canada's Richelieu River, and the Saint Lawrence River.
The north and northwest slopes of Street Mtn. drain into the headwaters of the Chubb River, thence into the Ausable's West Branch.
The west end of Street Mtn. drains into the northern Moose Creek, and thence into the Cold River, the Raquette River, and the Saint Lawrence River in Canada.
The southwest slopes of Street Mtn. drain into Roaring Brook, thence into Duck Hole pond, the source of the Cold River.

Street Mountain is within the High Peaks Wilderness Area of New York's Adirondack Park.

The trail to the peak is unmarked and can be disorienting if there is snow covering the footpath. One portion of the trail requires hikers to cross a stream and it can become uncrossable if raining (especially during Spring snowmelt). Hikers are advised to bring a map and compass.

Gallery

See also 
 List of mountains in New York
 Northeast 111 4,000-footers
 Adirondack High Peaks
 Adirondack Forty-Sixers

Notes

External links 
 
 
 

Mountains of Essex County, New York
Adirondack High Peaks
Mountains of New York (state)